My Soul is the third studio album by American soul singer-songwriter Leela James. It was released  by Stax Records  on May 25, 2010, in the United States, marking James' debut with the label. Her highest-charting effort to date, the album debuted and peaked at number 7 on Billboards Top R&B/Hip-Hop Albums chart and at number 37 on the US Billboard 200 chart.

Critical reception

Allmusic editor Andy Kellman found that "My Soul is James' best yet in every way. It does not feature quite as many big-name collaborators or eye-popping elements as her debut, but the material is stronger, more balanced between vintage and contemporary sounds, and James sounds more comfortable in her voice. Just as important is that she is coming into her own as a songwriter; four of the songs were written entirely by her, and they are among the album’s most affecting moments."

Track listing
Credits adapted from the liner notes of My Soul.

Sample credits
 "I Ain't New To This" contains a sample of "Solitary Love Affair", performed by Millie Jackson.
 "The Fact Is" contains a sample of "Lovely Way She Loves", performed by The Moments
 "Tell Me You Love Me" contains a sample from "Then You Can Tell Me Goodbye", performed by The Manhattans.
 "It's Over" contains a sample of "Can't Be Alone", performed by Hodges, James & Smith.

Personnel

Anabel DeHaven – Make–Up, Stylist
Kyonte Vincent – Engineer
Al Manerson – Executive Producer
Dwayne Moore – Bass
Shelby Johnson – Composer, Vocals (Background)
Milton Fletcher Jr. – Keyboards
Michael Gassel – Package Design
Sammy Friedman – Composer
Gus McKinney – Composer
Gerrard Baker – Producer
Gerald Craig Glanville – Composer
Carvin Haggins – Composer
Carl "Chucky" Thompson – Producer
Bud Wales – Sax (Tenor)
Brenda Walkin – Sax (Tenor)
Billy Earl Kennedy – Composer
Barry Wilson – Sax (Baritone)
Andrea Martin – Composer, Vocals (Background)
Sylvia Robinson – Composer
William "Mickey" Stevenson – Composer
Gordon Williams – Composer, Engineer
Paul Blakemore – Mastering
Deborah Mannis–Gardner – Sample Clearance

Billy Brown – Composer
Mary Hogan – A&R
Eric "Ebo" Butler – Engineer
Tiffany Wilson – Vocals (Background)
Ray Murray – Producer, Engineer
Malik Albert – Producer, Engineer
Ivan "Orthodox" Barias – Producer, Engineer
Carvin "Ransum" Haggins – Producer, Engineer
Seth Presant – Mixing
Raheem DeVaughn – Composer, Vocals (Background), Vocals
Steve "Supe" White – Producer, Engineer
Johnnie "Smurf" Smith – Keyboards
Leela James – Arranger, Composer, Vocals (Background), Additional Production, Executive Producer, Vocals
George "Spanky" McCurdy – Drums
Devin DeHaven – Photography
Ben Wendel – Sax (Tenor)
Kadis – Producer, Engineer
Larissa Collins – Art Direction
Mark Bowers – Bass, Guitar
Al Goodman – Composer
Chris Dunn – Executive Producer
John D. Loudermilk – Composer

Charts

References

External links
 

2010 albums
Leela James albums
Stax Records albums